Manduca afflicta is a moth of the  family Sphingidae known from Cuba and the Bahamas.  It is similar to Manduca sexta. Adults feed on nectar from flowers. The larvae have been recorded feeding on Cestrum diurnum, the day-blooming jessamine, a member of the family Solanaceae.

Subspecies
M. a. afflicta (Cuba)
M. a. bahamensis (B. P. Clark, 1916) (the Bahamas)

References

Manduca
Moths described in 1865